The 1997–98 Iona Gaels men's basketball team represented Iona College during the 1997–98 NCAA Division I men's basketball season. The Gaels, led second-year by head coach Tim Welsh, played their home games at the John A. Mulcahy Campus Events Center and were members of the Metro Atlantic Athletic Conference. The Gaels finished second in the MAAC regular season standings, and would go on to win the MAAC Basketball tournament to receive an automatic bid to the 1998 NCAA tournament  the program's first appearance in the "Big Dance" since 1985. As the No. 12 seed in the Southeast region, the Gaels lost to No. 5 seed Syracuse in the opening round.

Roster

Schedule and results

|-
!colspan=9 style=| Regular season

|-
!colspan=9 style=| MAAC tournament

|-
!colspan=9 style=| NCAA tournament

Awards and honors
Kashif Hameed – MAAC Player of the Year

References

Iona Gaels men's basketball seasons
Iona
Iona